This list is of fatal accidents on the Isle of Man TT Mountain Course used for the Isle of Man TT races, Manx Grand Prix and Classic TT races. The TT Course was first used as an automobile road-racing circuit for the 1908 Tourist Trophy event for racing automobiles, then known as the Four Inch Course. For the 1911 Isle of Man TT race motor-cycle races, the event was moved from the St John's Short Course to the Four Inch Course by the UK Auto-Cycle Club, and became known as the Isle of Man TT Mountain Course, or TT Course, when used for motorcycle racing.

Victor Surridge was the first fatality on the Isle of Man TT Mountain Course, after an accident at Glen Helen during practice for the 1911 Isle of Man TT races. This was possibly the first death in the Isle of Man of a person in a motorcycle or road vehicle accident. 

The deadliest year was 2005, when 11 people died; three riders and one marshal died during the June race, and six riders and one course bystander died during the Manx Grand Prix in August/September 2005. Since 1937, the only year in which races were held but no fatalities occurred was 1982.

Racing deaths

Motorcycles & sidecars

Motor racing

Other deaths

Race officials
Competition

Non competition

Parade laps

Unofficial competition testing

Spectators
Competition

Non competition

By nationality

Sources

See also
Isle of Man TT Races
Manx Grand Prix
North West 200
Ulster Grand Prix
Clypse Course
St. John's Short Course
List of Billown Course fatal accidents
List of North West 200 Course fatal accidents
List of Dundrod Circuit fatal accidents

External links
 Detailed race results Isle of Man TT

Motorsport in the Isle of Man
Lists of motorsport fatalities
Motorcycle sport lists
Sport deaths in the Isle of Man